David Crockett High School is a high school located in Jonesborough, Tennessee. It is one of two high schools in the Washington County School System and serves the southern part of the county. Its "rival" school is Daniel Boone High School, the other high school in Washington County, which serves the northern part of the county.  

The first graduating class of David Crockett High School was awarded diplomas in 1972. Enrollment as of 2005 was over 1,200 students. Students start from five elementary/middle schools: Jonesborough Elementary and Middle, West View, Lamar, Grandview, and South Central. The school colors are brown (or "buckskin") and old gold. The school's mascot is a Pioneer.

The school was named after the celebrated 19th-century American folk hero, frontiersman, soldier and politician, David (Davy) Crockett, who in life shunned the name "Davy" and referred to himself exclusively as "David".

Principals 
In 2002, Henry Marable became the principal of David Crockett High School. When the school first opened, Marable taught and worked as a coach. Since then, he has worked as the principal at area schools such as Jonesborough Middle School and Science Hill High School. As of the 2009-2010 school year, Henry Marable is no longer the DCHS principal. He retired from a long career in education at the end of the 2008-2009 school year. Carmen Belcher Bryant, who had previously been an assistant principal at the school succeeded Mr. Marable as principal of David Crockett High School. In the 2011-2012 school year, Andrew Hare became the school's principal, until in the 2015 - 2016 school year he stepped down. Previously, he was a vice principal, history teacher, and coach at DCHS. Peggy Wright is currently the school principal.

School content 

David Crockett has an Advanced Placement program offering classes in language and composition, literature, Human Geography, United States history and government, probability and statistics, and calculus. In keeping with the agricultural tradition of the area, the school has programs in agriculture, a working farm with live animals, and a greenhouse. There is a weather station on campus as well as solar panels. Skills training is also available for students in fields including healthcare and auto-mechanics. In many cases, certificates can be earned prior to graduation.

Sport 

Each year, David Crockett plays Daniel Boone in football. The game referred to as the "Musket Bowl" was first played in 1971 when the two new consolidated high schools opened their doors, and David Crockett High defeated Daniel Boone High by a score of 72-0. The next week, David Crockett was ranked No. 1 in the state by Litratings, a difference-by-scores system. Since then, the Daniel Boone Trailblazers have dominated the series and hold a 37-12 edge over the David Crockett Pioneers (as of 2019), winning the latest game played 28-20 at home. The game gained popularity by being played annually in the Mini-Dome at East Tennessee State University (ETSU). Today, the Musket Bowl is held at Daniel Boone and David Crockett High Schools where each school rotates the event each year.  The winning team is presented with a “musket.” If that team wins three years consecutively, they keep the musket, and a new one is purchased for the next season’s game. Daniel Boone High has accomplished this more than Crockett. It's the “Battle of Washington County…the Pioneers vs. the Trailblazers.” Recently a series called "The Kings of The Nolichucky", has pitted the football team from David Crockett against nearby Chuckey Doak and Unicoi County High Schools whose service areas also border the Nolichucky River. David Crockett is undefeated in the series and holds the title "Kings of the Nolichucky" as of 2014/15.

References

External links
 David Crockett High School

Public high schools in Tennessee
Educational institutions established in 1971
Schools in Washington County, Tennessee
Davy Crockett
1971 establishments in Tennessee